Nils Rydström (15 September 1921 – 20 September 2018) was a Swedish foil fencer. He competed at the 1948 and 1952 Summer Olympics.

References

External links
 

1921 births
2018 deaths
Swedish male foil fencers
Olympic fencers of Sweden
Fencers at the 1948 Summer Olympics
Fencers at the 1952 Summer Olympics
Sportspeople from Stockholm
Lieutenants of the Royal Victorian Order